Jai Kanhaiya Lal Ki is a  Hindi television comedy soap opera that premiered on Star Bharat from 1 January 2018. The show is set in Kolkata, West Bengal. This is the remake of popular Bengali serial Bhojo Gobindo that aired on Star Jalsha. The series went off air on 28 May 2018. The whole series is digitally available on Disney+ Hotstar.

Plot
The show revolves around three main characters; Janki Nath Chaudhry, Dali, and Kanhaiya. It narrates the story of a rich grandfather Janki Nath Chaudhary and his spoilt granddaughter Dali  whereas Vishal Vashittha came on board as Kanhaiya who plays the character of Bawarchi on the show. The story is about a grandfather and his spoilt grand daughter Dali and how a cook changed their lives. In the end, Kanhaiya marries Daali.

Cast

Main
Vishal Vashishtha as Shaurya Gupta "Kanhaiya"
Shweta Bhattacharya as Daali Chaudhary
Dipankar De as Janki Prasad Chaudhary
Rupanjana Mitra as Sandhya Nath Chaudhary
Harshit Arura as Rocky

Recurring
Tramila Bhattacharjee as Vaijanti Mousi
Madhurima Basak as Maya
Rajdeep Gupta as Ravi
Prakruti Mishra as Devyani
Neha Tiwari as Sheila
Purnima Kaushik as Munni
Sonu Dagar as Masterje
Rahul Ghosh as Rocket

Adaptations

References

External links
 

Star Bharat original programming
Hindi-language television shows
2018 Indian television series debuts
2018 Indian television series endings
Television shows set in Kolkata